Timothy Andrew Mayer (February 22, 1938 – February 28, 1964) was a racecar driver from Dalton, Pennsylvania in the United States.  He participated in one World Championship Formula One Grand Prix, on October 7, 1962. He retired with ignition failure and scored no championship points.

Career
Mayer's older brother Teddy was one of the founders of the McLaren team, with Bruce McLaren. Both brothers travelled from the United States to Europe in the early 1960s with future Grand Prix winner Peter Revson. The McLaren team's first championship series entries were for the 1964 Tasman Series, running Timmy Mayer and team-leader McLaren in custom-built Cooper T70 cars. However, Mayer was killed in practice for the final race of the series, at Longford, Tasmania, when he lost control at over 100 mph and spun and hit a tree next to the course. His car disintegrated, and wreckage narrowly missed young children who were spectators. Mayer died instantly from the impact. There was a memorial stone placed on the side of the road where Mayer had died, but it was moved, and is now to be seen, with his helmet, at the Country Club Hotel in Longford.

In his eulogy of team mate and friend Tim Mayer, Bruce McLaren wrote:
"The news that he had died instantly was a terrible shock to all of us, but who is to say that he had not seen more, done more and learned more in his few years than many people do in a lifetime? To do something well is so worthwhile that to die trying to do it better cannot be foolhardy. It would be a waste of life to do nothing with one's ability, for I feel that life is measured in achievement, not in years alone."

Racing record

SCCA National Championship Runoffs

Complete Formula One World Championship results
(key)

Complete British Saloon Car Championship results
(key) (Races in bold indicate pole position; races in italics indicate fastest lap.)

Complete Tasman Series results

References

1938 births
1964 deaths
American Formula One drivers
Cooper Formula One drivers
Tasman Series drivers
People from Lackawanna County, Pennsylvania
Racing drivers from Pennsylvania
Racing drivers who died while racing
Sport deaths in Australia
Accidental deaths in Tasmania
SCCA National Championship Runoffs winners